Leah Namugerwa (born 2004) is a youth climate activist in Uganda. She is known for leading tree planting campaigns and for starting a petition to enforce the plastic bag ban in Uganda. Following inspiration from Greta Thunberg, she began supporting school strikes in February 2019 with fellow Fridays for the Future Uganda organizer Sadrach Nirere.

Namugerwa spoke at the World Urban Forum in 2020 and was a youth delegate at COP25. Her uncle, Tim Mugerwa is also a prominent environmentalist in Uganda. Leah Namugerwas is a member of the Anglican Church of Uganda.

Climate activism 
Namugerwa heard of Greta Thunberg and her Friday strikes in 2018. She was later inspired to take similar action as Greta Thunberg at 13, after she watched a local news report about mudslides and flooding in rural sections of the country. Namugerwa has since become a prominent young climate advocate and an integral member of Africa's most prominent chapter of Fridays for the Future taking place in Uganda. She teamed up with Sadrach Nirere, Hilda Flavia Nakabuye, and her cousin Bob Motavu to birth the Fridays for the Future Uganda. She has been engaged in Friday striking since February 2019, calling for more climate actions, and she has led the writing of a petition to enforce the ban of plastic bags.

Namugerwa uses social media to spread the message of how important it is to protect the planet. She takes photos of herself doing positive projects for the environment like planting tress and then posts it. Namugerwa uses her social media power to encourage the youth to regularly plant trees and get involved in activities and projects that help to protect the environment.

Fridays for the Future 
Namugerwa has stated that "Friday's used to be ordinary, but now it is my busiest day of the week.”

Namugerwa's first days as a climate striker looked weird too many people including her own family. Civilians on the street kept on shaking their heads wondering what had happened to her. Many people were and are still opposed to her striking efforts. They argue that at Namugerwa's young age she should not be missing any days of school. Her daily routine consists of waking up, carrying her placard and standing on the roadside or wherever she deems suitable to communicate her message. She sometimes sits when she gets tired of standing while encouraging people to read her message.

There are many environmental issues happening in her country of Uganda that Namugerwa protests against. Another main reason she strikes is because of the lack of media coverage. She feels the media is always reporting politics and celebrity gossip. The silence on environmental injustice seems to be intentional. Most people do not care what they do to the environment. She noticed adults were not willing to offer leadership and volunteered herself. Environmental injustice is injustice to Namugerwa. 

The only challenges she has faced from striking is a little backlash from law enforcement and the government. Uganda's government's response to strikers sometimes gives her fear. Her first main protest was blocked on May 15th and on another occasion her fellow strikers were chased from striking outside parliament. Fridays For the Future grew from one person to millions, from one country to the whole world. The increasing number of climate strikers and activists are giving her hope that climate action is within our reach.

Accomplishments 
Leah Namugerwa celebrated her 15th birthday by planting 200 trees instead of throwing a birthday party, and since then she has launched the Birthday Trees project, to give out seedlings to those who wish to celebrate their birthdays by planting trees. Her major goal is to see the enforcement of current climate legislation (Paris 21 agreement) and to attract more coverage of issues of climate change. She organized marches along with other young climate advocates to mark the global climate strike on 29 November 2020, and the lakeshore of Kampala's Ggaba Beach was also cleaned to celebrate the day; Dorothy Nalubega, a member of a women's agriculturalist and environmental group was also in attendance. Namugerwa has continuously called on the government of Uganda to fully implement the Paris Climate Agreement.

Current life 
Namugerwa continues to fight climate change by planting trees. She also stays busy speaking at climate summits and conferences in Africa and around the world. Namurgerwa attended the COP27 Climate Conference in Egypt this year. The United Nations Climate Change Conference or Conference of the Parties of the UNFCCC, more commonly referred to as COP27, was the 27th United Nations Climate Change conference held annually for two weeks. The goal is to come together to support climate policies around the world that politicians and the general public can tackle together. Namugerwa spoke during the climate conference on November 7, 2022.

References 

Ugandan activists
Climate activists
Living people
2004 births